Green dock beetle is a common name for several insects and may refer to:

Gastrophysa cyanea, native to North America
Gastrophysa viridula, native to Europe

Chrysomelinae